Hussein Khaliqi or Huseyn Xelîqî or Hossein Khalighi or Ḥusayn Khalīqī, is a contemporary Kurdish writer. He was born in Iranian Kurdistan. He studied philosophy, history and sociology in University of Tabriz. He is currently the head of the Kurdish Institute of Stockholm.

Works

Books
Bingehên giştî yên komelnasî or Binaxe giştîyekanî komełnasî (The foundations of Sociology), 447 pp., Apec Publishers, Spånga, Sweden, 1991. 
Dastanî mafî mirov or Dāstān-i māf-i mirǒf (The story of human rights), 208 pp., Stockholm, 1995. 
Mêjûy sedekenî nêwerast (The history of the Middle Ages), translation of a work from Russian by G.M. Dinskuy-u  and A.U. Agibalu, 357 pp.,  Arzan Publishers, Jönköping, Sweden, 1995. 
Binaxekanî rêbazî şorişgerî : bizûtnewey rizgarîxwazî nîştimanî Felestîn (The foundations of revolutionary method: the national liberation movement of Palestine), 195 pp., Arzan Publishers, Jönköping, Sweden, 1996. 
Jan  û Jiyan (Pain and Life), 321 pp., Rabûn Publishers, Uppsala, Sweden, 1998. 

Kurdish-language writers
Living people
Kurdish social scientists
Year of birth missing (living people)